Tallinna Arte Gümnaasium (Tallinn Arte Gymnasium) is a school, located in the district of Mustamäe, Tallinn, Estonia.
As of September 2008, the headmaster is the former headteacher, Sirje Ebral.

Early history
The school was founded in 1981 as Tallinn Secondary School No. 49 (Tallinna 49. keskkool). It was renamed in 2002. The school had already built an indoor swimming pool, which was also opened in 1981. In 1983, the famous junior football club, "Tallinna Lõvid" (Lions of Tallinn), was founded. Later that year, the school started with its first Mothers-Day concert "Orhidee Emale", which remains an annual tradition of the school.
In 1991, the school opened a renovated library.

Later history
During 2001/2002, the school's bathrooms, gym, pool, library, cafeteria and the main lounge have been renovated.

Famous graduates
Mart Poom – Estonian football goalkeeper
Martin Müürsepp – Estonian basketballer
Martin Reim – Estonian footballer
Maret Maripuu – Estonian politician
Evelin Pang - Estonian actress

Awards
2002 – "Well run school"
2002 – "Best library"
2004 – "Best learning environment"

External links
 

Schools in Tallinn
Educational institutions established in 1981
1981 establishments in Estonia